Sarmaşık is a quarter of the town Bayırköy, Bilecik District, Bilecik Province, Turkey. Its population is 141 (2021).

References

Populated places in Bilecik District